Lines and Shadows is a 1984 nonfiction book by Joseph Wambaugh, a former police officer with the Los Angeles Police Department, chronicling the activities of the Border Crime Task Force of the San Diego Police Department between October 1976 and April 1978.

References

1984 non-fiction books
Non-fiction crime books
History of San Diego
Culture of San Diego
Books with cover art by Paul Bacon
William Morrow and Company books